Juruá is a municipality located in the Brazilian state of Amazonas. Its population was 15,106 (2020) and its area is 19,400 km².

The municipality contains 62% of the  Baixo Juruá Extractive Reserve, created in 2001.
The municipality contains about 12% of the Tefé National Forest, created in 1989.

References

Municipalities in Amazonas (Brazilian state)